Harry Barnhart may refer to:

Harry Horner Barnhart (1874–1948), American conductor and musician
Harry J. Barnhart (1890–1961), American football and basketball coach